Çamlıbel may refer to:

 Çamlıbel, Çameli
 Çamlıbel, Daday, a village
 Çamlıbel, Gölyaka
 Çamlıbel, Pozantı, a village in Pozantı district of Adana Province, Turkey
 Çamlıbel, Finike, a village in Finike district of Antalya Province, Turkey
 Çamlıbel, Oltu
 Çamlıbel, Silifke, a village in Silifke district of Mersin Province, Turkey
 Myrtou or Çamlıbel, a town in Cyprus